The Haihe Educational Football Stadium is a multi-purpose stadium in Tianjin, China. The stadium opened in 2011.

References

Football venues in Tianjin
Sports venues in Tianjin
Sports venues completed in 2011